Ajab Gayer Ajab Katha is a Bengali language fantasy  comedy film directed by Tapan Sinha based on a novel Nabiganjer Daityo of Sirshendu Mukhopadhyay. This film was released in 1998 in the banner of Shree Venkatesh Films. This was the last complete movie made by director Tapan Sinha.

Plot
Birchandra, the king without kingdom lives alone in his palace at Nabiganj village. He is least bothered about his kinghood and hidden royal treasure. Few villagers take undue advantage of his indifference. One unknown bodybuilder Kinkar come in the village who lost his memory. Birchandra give him shelter. Local teacher Dukkhoharan and old priest of the village realises that some of criminals may attack Birchandra for king's treasure that is hidden below his palace.

Cast
 Soumitra Chatterjee as King Birchandra
 Debashree Roy as Tiya
 Manoj Mitra as Priest
 Debesh Roy Chowdhury as Dukhoharan
 Kaushik Sen
 Rajatava Dutta as Goon
 Nirmal Kumar
 Kaushik Chakrabarty
 Shankar Roy
 Dheeman Chakraborty
 Barun Chakraborty

References

1998 films
Indian children's films
Bengali-language Indian films
Indian fantasy comedy films
2010s fantasy comedy films
Films based on Indian novels
Films based on works by Shirshendu Mukhopadhyay
Films directed by Tapan Sinha
1990s Bengali-language films